Cocamide DEA, or cocamide diethanolamine, is a diethanolamide made by reacting the mixture of fatty acids from coconut oils with diethanolamine. It is a viscous liquid and is used as a foaming agent in bath products like shampoos and hand soaps, and in cosmetics as an emulsifying agent. See cocamide for the discussion of the lengths of carbon chains in the molecules in the mixture. The chemical formula of individual components is CH3(CH2)nC(=O)N(CH2CH2OH)2, where n typically ranges from 8 to 18.

Safety

The International Agency for Research on Cancer (IARC) lists coconut oil diethanolamine condensate (cocamide DEA) as an IARC Group 2B carcinogen, which identifies this chemical as possibly carcinogenic to humans. The listing is based on a dermal animal bioassay.

In June 2012, the California Office of Environmental Health Hazard Assessment added cocamide DEA to the California Proposition 65 (1986) list of chemicals known to cause cancer.

Cocamide DEA has a high irritation potential.

See also
 Cocamide
 Cocamide MEA
 List of cosmetic ingredients

References 

Non-ionic surfactants
Cosmetics chemicals
Fatty acid amides
Diols
IARC Group 2B carcinogens